The 2021 College Basketball Invitational (CBI) was a single-elimination men's college basketball tournament consisting of eight National Collegiate Athletic Association (NCAA) Division I teams that did not participate in the 2021 NCAA Division I men's basketball tournament or the NIT. It was held from March 22 to 24. This event marked the 13th year the tournament has been held, after the 2020 edition was cancelled due to the COVID-19 pandemic. In February 2021, the CBI was reported to be exploring holding its annual postseason tournament in a neutral site format rather than on campus.   Subsequently, the site was announced as being the Ocean Center in Daytona Beach, Florida. Pepperdine won the tournament.

Participating teams
The 2021 bracket was unveiled on March 15. For the 2021 event the championship game was a single game instead of a three game series.

Declined invitations 
Marshall
UTSA
Washington State

Schedule

Bracket

* Denotes overtime period.

References

External links
 College Basketball Invitational official website

College Basketball Invitational
College Basketball Invitational
College Basketball Inivtational